The 2004 Georgia Bulldogs football team represented the University of Georgia during the 2004 NCAA Division I-A football season The Bulldogs completed the season with a 10–2 record.  The Bulldogs had a regular season Southeastern Conference (SEC) record of 6–2, but did not win the SEC East, having lost to Tennessee and Auburn.  Georgia beat Wisconsin in the 2005 Outback Bowl and finished the season ranked 6th in the Coaches' Poll.  This was the Georgia Bulldogs' fourth season under the guidance of head coach Mark Richt.

Schedule

Roster

References

Georgia
Georgia Bulldogs football seasons
ReliaQuest Bowl champion seasons
Georgia Bulldogs football